Napoleon and Me is a 2006 Italian-French-Spanish historical comedy-drama directed by Paolo Virzì. It is loosely based on the novel N. by Ernesto Ferrero.

Plot

In Portoferraio, island of Elba, young teacher Martino is fired over his criticism of Napoleon Bonaparte.
Then Napoleon is exiled to reign over tiny Elba.
He hires Martino as his secretary.

Cast

See also
 List of Italian films

References

External links

2006 films
Films based on Italian novels
Spanish comedy-drama films
2006 comedy-drama films
Films directed by Paolo Virzì
Depictions of Napoleon on film
Italian comedy-drama films
French comedy-drama films
2000s Italian films
2000s French films